The common frog (Rana temporaria), also known as the European common frog and European common brown frog, is a semi-aquatic frog of the family Ranidae found throughout much of Europe including the British Isles.

Common frog may also refer to:

 Common green frog (Hylarana erythraea), a frog in the family Ranidae found in Brunei, Cambodia, Indonesia, Laos, Malaysia, Myanmar, Singapore, Thailand, and Vietnam
 Common mist frog (Litoria rheocola), a frog in the family Ranidae native to northeastern Queensland, Australia
 Common parsley frog (Pelodytes punctatus), a frog in the family Pelodytidae found France, Spain, Portugal and a small part of Northwestern Italy (Piemont and Liguria)
 Common puddle frog (Occidozyga laevis), a frog in the family Dicroglossidae endemic to the Philippines
 Common reed frog (Hyperolius viridiflavus), a frog in the family Hyperoliidae found in Burundi, the Democratic Republic of the Congo, Ethiopia, Kenya, Rwanda, Sudan, Tanzania, and Uganda, and possibly the Central African Republic, Chad and Eritrea
 Common rocket frog (Colostethus panamansis), a frog in the family Dendrobatidae found in northwestern Colombia and Panama
 Common sand frog (Tomopterna cryptotis), a frog in the family Pyxicephalidae found in Sub-Saharan Africa

See also

 Common rain frog (disambiguation)
 Common tree frog (disambiguation)